The 1942–43 Boston Bruins season was the Bruins' 19th season in the NHL.

Regular season

Final standings

Record vs. opponents

Schedule and results

Playoffs
The Boston Bruins defeated the Montreal Canadiens in the Semi-Finals 4–1 but lost to the Detroit Red Wings in The Stanley Cup Final however being swept four games to none.

Player statistics

Regular season
Scoring

Goaltending

Playoffs
Scoring

Goaltending

See also
1942–43 NHL season

References

Boston Bruins
Boston Bruins
Boston Bruins seasons
Boston Bruins
Boston Bruins
1940s in Boston